AG-5 or Ag-5 may refer to:

 USS General Alava (AG-5), a cargo ship acquired by the United States Navy during the Spanish–American War
 Bell 47, a two-seat agricultural version of the Bell 47G-5 light helicopter later known as the Ag-5

See also
 AG5 (disambiguation)